Robert Earl "Bob" McMillen (March 5, 1928 – April 1, 2007) was an American athlete, who competed mainly in the 1500 m.

While at Cathedral High School in Los Angeles, McMillen won the mile and set the meet record of 4:24.0 at the CIF California State Meet in 1946. While at Glendale Community College he qualified for the 1948 Summer Olympics in the Steeplechase.  Then at Occidental College he won the 1952 NCAA Championship in the 1500 meters.

Born in Los Angeles, California, McMillen competed for the United States in the 1952 Summer Olympics held in Helsinki, Finland in the 1500 m, where he won the silver medal with a rush at the end.  His final sprint missed catching leader Josy Barthel by a foot and a half at the line.  Both athletes were given the same time, a new Olympic record.

McMillen is a 2004 inductee into the Glendale College Athletic Hall of Fame.  He is also a member of the Occidental College Track and Field Hall of Fame.

References

External links

1928 births
2007 deaths
American male middle-distance runners
American male steeplechase runners
Olympic silver medalists for the United States in track and field
Athletes (track and field) at the 1952 Summer Olympics
Athletes (track and field) at the 1955 Pan American Games
Track and field athletes from California
Medalists at the 1952 Summer Olympics
Pan American Games track and field athletes for the United States